Dalibor Kozić (born 10 February 1988) is a Bosnian professional footballer who plays as a goalkeeper for Bosnian Premier League club Radnik Bijeljina.

He has won the Bosnian Premier League once with Zrinjski Mostar in the 2016–17 season.

Club career
Kozić started off his career at hometown club Kozara Gradiška, where he was called up to the first team in 2011. He stayed at Kozara until 2013, after which he joined Borac Banja Luka, but left the club before the start of the 2013–14 season.

In February 2014, he signed with Rudar Prijedor with whom he won the 2014–15 First League of RS and got promoted to the Bosnian Premier League.

In the summer of 2016, Kozić signed with Zrinjski Mostar. He stayed at Zrinjski for one season and also won the Bosnian Premier League in that season. He left Zrinjski in July 2017.

Only hours after leaving Zrinjski, on 4 July 2017, Kozić signed for newly promoted club GOŠK Gabela. In June 2018, Kozić extended his contract with GOŠK until June 2019. He left GOŠK after the club got relegated to the First League of FBiH on 30 May 2019.

On 13 June 2019, Kozić signed a two-year contract with Radnik Bijeljina. He made his official debut for Radnik on 11 July 2019, in a 2–0 home win against Spartak Trnava in the 2019–20 UEFA Europa League first qualifying round. Kozić made his first league appearance for Radnik on 21 July 2019, in a 2–1 away loss against Sloboda Tuzla.

Career statistics

Club

Honours
Rudar Prijedor
First League of RS: 2014–15

Zrinjski Mostar'
Bosnian Premier League: 2016–17

References

External links
Dalibor Kozić at Sofascore
Dalibor Kozić profile at nfsbih.ba

Living people
1988 births
People from Gradiška, Bosnia and Herzegovina
Bosnia and Herzegovina footballers
Premier League of Bosnia and Herzegovina players
First League of the Republika Srpska players
FK Kozara Gradiška players
FK Borac Banja Luka players
FK Rudar Prijedor players
HŠK Zrinjski Mostar players
NK GOŠK Gabela players
FK Radnik Bijeljina players
Association football goalkeepers